Over its run, Mystery Science Theater 3000 has seen the arrival and departure of various characters. It also featured many recurring guest characters. Below is a listing of both the main characters and the recurring characters from the series.

Main characters

Notes
Cambot is a regular character throughout the entire run of the show, but has no performer.

 "Joel Hodgson" during season 0; Simply "Joel" (no last name) during Season 1.
 Simply "Frank" during seasons 2 and 3.
 Guest appearance only.

Recurring guest characters

 Magic Voice - a disembodied female voice that would warn the crew of upcoming commercial breaks and make other announcements.
 Jerry and Sylvia (various unpaid interns at Best Brains) - two "mole people" from the movie The Mole People (featured much later as a season 8 episode) who occasionally assisted the Mads and stopped by for social events. They also work Deep 13's camera in the first host segment of "Lost Continent". Presumably named after Sylvia and Gerry Anderson, the creative team behind Space: 1999 and Supermarionation shows like Thunderbirds and Stingray, some of which were featured as KTMA-season episodes.
 Jack Perkins (Michael J. Nelson) - in real life the host of the A&E Network's Biography program, Perkins first appeared in MST3K simply to annoy the Mads by describing the movie with glowing praise. When MST3K appeared in syndication as The Mystery Science Hour, Nelson's fake "Jack Perkins" hosted the show.
 Torgo (Michael J. Nelson) - a monster/henchman (supposed to be a satyr) in Manos: The Hands of Fate, Torgo was among the most frequently returning "guest characters" of MST3K. He got his knees fixed and returned as "Torgo the White" (an obvious parody of Gandalf the White) to accompany TV's Frank to "Second Banana Heaven" and was never seen again (episode 624, "Samson vs. the Vampire Women").
 Jan-in-the-Pan (Mary Jo Pehl) - a woman's severed head from the movie The Brain That Wouldn't Die.
 Pitch (Paul Chaplin) - a devil from the Mexican movie Santa Claus, Pitch was one of the few characters from the Comedy Central seasons to return in the Sci Fi Channel seasons.
 Santa Claus - appeared three times on the show, including a fight with Pitch, bellowing, "I'm here to chew candy canes and kick ass, and I'm all out of candy canes!".  Portrayed twice by Kevin Murphy and once by Joel Hodgson.
 The Nanites (voiced variously by Kevin Murphy, Paul Chaplin, Mary Jo Pehl, and Bridget Jones) - self-replicating, bio-engineered organisms that work on the ship, they are microscopic creatures that reside in the S.O.L.'s computer systems. (They are similar to the creatures in Star Trek: The Next Generation episode "Evolution", which featured "nanites" taking over the Enterprise.) The Nanites made their first appearance in season 8. Based on the concept of nanotechnology, their comical deus ex machina activities included such diverse tasks as instant repair and construction, hairstyling, performing a Nanite variation of a flea circus, conducting a microscopic war, and even destroying the Observers' planet after a dangerously vague request from Mike to "take care of [a] little problem". They also ran a microbrewery. The Nanites were largely forgotten about during the show's last season, and we are not given an explanation of their fate following the series finale.
Kevin Murphy played Wade the Nanite.
Paul Chaplin played Ned the Nanite.
Mary Jo Pehl played Jody the Nanite and Shelli the Nanite.
Bridget Jones played Slicer the Nanite.
 Ortega (Paul Chaplin) - an unintelligible, decrepit, cigar-smoking henchman from the movie The Incredibly Strange Creatures Who Stopped Living and Became Mixed-Up Zombies, Ortega recurred occasionally in the three Sci Fi seasons.
 "Krankor" (Bill Corbett), who appeared in a host segment during the "Prince of Space" episode, and returned three episodes later in a host segment for "Invasion of the Neptune Men", featuring a movie with a similar plot. He was a vain, would-be conqueror with an unfortunately chicken-like appearance and a drawn-out, braying laugh (described by BBI as "like a Buick not turning over").
 The Skeleton Crew is Kinga's house band that plays in intros and outgos segments. Har Mar Superstar leads the Skeleton Crew as their director.

References

 
Mystery Science Theater 3000
Mystery Science Theater 3000